Abdoulaye Diallo (born 21 October 1992) is a Senegalese footballer who plays as a centre back for Jeunesse d'Esch.

References

External links
 

1992 births
Living people
Senegalese footballers
Senegalese expatriate footballers
Association football defenders
Casa Sports players
FC Atyrau players
FK Jelgava players
FK Atlantas players
JK Narva Trans players
Wigry Suwałki players
Jeunesse Esch players
Latvian Higher League players
A Lyga players
Meistriliiga players
I liga players
Expatriate footballers in Kazakhstan
Senegalese expatriate sportspeople in Kazakhstan
Expatriate footballers in Latvia
Senegalese expatriate sportspeople in Latvia
Expatriate footballers in Lithuania
Senegalese expatriate sportspeople in Lithuania
Expatriate footballers in Estonia
Senegalese expatriate sportspeople in Estonia
Expatriate footballers in Poland
Senegalese expatriate sportspeople in Poland
Senegal international footballers